Corsica is a borough in Jefferson County, Pennsylvania, United States. The population was 357 at the 2010 census. It was named for the island of Corsica, birthplace of Napoleon Bonaparte. The mayor of the borough is Dave Leadbetter.

Geography
Corsica is located in western Jefferson County at  (41.181233, -79.202287). Its western border is the Clarion County line.

U.S. Route 322 passes through the center of town as Main Street, and leads east  to Brookville, the Jefferson county seat, and west  to Clarion. Interstate 80 passes just north of the borough limits, with access from Exit 73 (Pennsylvania Route 949). I-80 leads east  to DuBois and west  to Interstate 79 near Mercer. PA 949 leads northeast  to Sigel and south  to Summerville.

History
Corsica suffered a devastating fire in 1873, which destroyed most of the town's businesses and residences.

The first spade of dirt signifying the groundbreaking for Interstate 80 was shoveled on March 19, 1959, near Corsica.

Demographics

As of the census of 2000, there were 354 people, 145 households, and 94 families residing in the borough. The population density was 758.9 people per square mile (290.8/km²). There were 157 housing units at an average density of 336.6 per square mile (129.0/km²). The racial makeup of the borough was 98.59% White, 0.85% Asian, and 0.56% from two or more races.

There were 145 households, out of which 30.3% had children under the age of 18 living with them, 55.2% were married couples living together, 4.8% had a female householder with no husband present, and 34.5% were non-families. 30.3% of all households were made up of individuals, and 11.7% had someone living alone who was 65 years of age or older. The average household size was 2.44 and the average family size was 3.08.

In the borough the population was spread out, with 26.6% under the age of 18, 11.0% from 18 to 24, 28.0% from 25 to 44, 20.3% from 45 to 64, and 14.1% who were 65 years of age or older. The median age was 34 years. For every 100 females there were 114.5 males. For every 100 females age 18 and over, there were 101.6 males.

The median income for a household in the borough was $30,625, and the median income for a family was $38,438. Males had a median income of $27,813 versus $18,125 for females. The per capita income for the borough was $13,752. About 7.1% of families and 11.0% of the population were below the poverty line, including 8.2% of those under age 18 and 17.8% of those age 65 or over.

Public services
The Clarion-Limestone Area School District provides kindergarten through 12th grade public education for the community. Clarion-Limestone Area School District operates two schools, Clarion-Limestone Jr/Sr High School (7th-12th) and Clarion-Limestone Elementary School (K-6th).

The borough is home to the Corsica Volunteer Fire Department.

References

External links
Borough of Corsica official website

Populated places established in 1847
Boroughs in Jefferson County, Pennsylvania
1847 establishments in Pennsylvania